Maxima Caesariensis (Latin for "The Caesarian province of Maximus"), also known as Britannia Maxima, was one of the provinces of the Diocese of "the Britains" created during the Diocletian Reforms at the end of the 3rd century. It was probably created after the defeat of the usurper Allectus by Constantius Chlorus in AD 296 and was mentioned in the  Verona List of the Roman provinces. Its position and capital remain uncertain, although it was probably adjacent to Flavia Caesariensis. On the basis of its governor's eventual consular rank, it is now usually considered to have consisted of Augusta or Londinium (London) and southeastern England.


History
Following the Roman conquest of Britain, Britain was administered as a single province from Camulodunum (Colchester) and then Londinium (London) until the Severan Reforms following the revolt of its governor Clodius Albinus. These divided the territory into Upper and Lower Britain (Britannia Superior and Inferior), whose respective capitals were at Londinium and Eboracum (York). During the first phases of the Diocletian Reforms, Britain was under the control of the Allectus's Britannic Empire as part of the Carausian Revolt. At some point after the territory was retaken by Constantius Chlorus in AD 296, the Diocese of the Britains (with its vicar at Londinium) was formed and made a part of Prefecture of Gaul. The Britains were divided among three, four, or five provinces, which seem to have borne the names Prima, Secunda, Maxima Caesariensis, and (possibly) Flavia Caesariensis and Valentia.

The placement and capitals of these late British provinces are uncertain, although the Notitia Dignitatum lists the governor of Maxima (originally an equestrian praeses) as having been elevated to consular rank. Scholars usually associate this with the administration at Londinium, which was also the capital of the diocesan vicar.

Describing the metropolitan sees of the early British church established by SS Fagan and "Duvian", Gerald of Wales placed "Maximia" in Eboracum (York) and Londinium in Flavia, saying the former was named for the emperor Maximus. William Camden followed him and this placement was generally accepted after the appearance of Charles Bertram's highly-influential 1740s forgery The Description of Britain, which gave Maxima borders from the Humber and Mersey to Hadrian's Wall; this work was debunked over the course of the mid-19th century.

Modern scholars are uncertain whether the province was named for the western senior emperor Valerius Maximian or the eastern junior emperor Galerius Maximian. Birley has argued that Maxima and Flavia originally consisted of a single province, which received the name Britannia Caesariensis as a mark of favour for support against the rebel Allectus in 296. Although Flavia is usually thought to have been formed from the old province of Lower Britain, Birley proposes that Upper Britain was divided in two (between Prima and Caesariensis) and then three (Prima, Maxima, and Flavia). This repeats Camden's earlier theory (relying on Sextus Rufus) that Maxima was formed first and Flavia followed sometime after.

References

Late Roman provinces
Roman Britain
States and territories established in the 3rd century
States and territories established in the 4th century
410 disestablishments